Sai Wing Mock (aka Mock Duck) (1879 – July 23, 1941) was a Chinese-American criminal and leader of the Hip Sing Tong, which replaced the On Leong Tong as the dominant Chinese-American Tong in the Manhattan Chinatown in the early 1900s.

Early criminal career
Mock Duck arrived in the United States during the late 1890s, settling in New York's Chinatown, where he formed the Hip Sing Tong, a minor criminal organization. Within a few years, Mock Duck challenged Tom Lee and the On Leong Tong for control of criminal activities in Chinatown, and for the police and political protection of Tammany Hall.

Chinatown kingpin
In 1900, Mock Duck demanded half of Lee's revenue from illegal gambling operations. When Lee refused, within 48 hours Mock Duck declared a Tong war against the On Leongs. Hip Sing men set one of Lee's boarding houses on fire, which resulted in the deaths of two men. In another incident, an On Leong man was decapitated by two Hip Sing hatchetmen, and open warfare began in Chinatown.

One Chinatown historian describes Mock Duck in 1904 as "strutting around on Pell Street, covered in diamonds," adding that, at that time, "Mock Duck is firmly in control of the Hip Sing, his sinister image bolstered by his long, lethal-looking fingernails, which signal he is too grand to do the dirty work he assigns to others."

Mock Duck survived repeated attempts on his life and wore a chain mail vest. He was named by the press the "Clay Pigeon of Chinatown" and the "Mayor of Chinatown". During several attempts on his life, Mock Duck reportedly squatted down in the street and fired at his attackers with two handguns with his eyes closed.

After Lee put a bounty on Mock Duck and the rest of the Hip Sings, Mock Duck formed an alliance with the rival Four Brothers Tong. Mock Duck took advantage of the reform crusade started by Charles Parkhurst. Duck posed as a businessman, and supplied information on the On Leong criminal operations to Parkhurst, including addresses. The authorities raided On Leong opium dens and gambling houses on Pell and Doyers Streets. However, Mock Duck held back the addresses of the more lucrative Mott Street operations for leverage against Lee. The warring Tongs signed a truce in 1906, but the Hip Sings and the On Leongs were again at war the following year.

Mock Duck finally defeated Lee in the "Bow Kum" Tong war of 1909–1910. He was arrested several times during the next decade, during which time a number of attempts were made on his life. But he was convicted only once in 1912, for operating a policy game, and served two years imprisonment in Sing Sing Prison.

Retirement and death
In 1932, Mock Duck agreed to an arrangement with the US and Chinese governments to declare a peace among the Tongs of Chinatown and he retired to Brooklyn where he lived until his death on July 23, 1941.

Footnotes

Notable Chinese tongs
Bing Kong Tong
Hip Sing Tong
On Leong Tong
Suey Sing Tong
Hop Sing Tong

See also
Hui
Tong Wars
Triad (underground society)
Tiandihui
List of Chinese criminal organizations
List of criminal enterprises, gangs and syndicates

References
Devito, Carlo. Encyclopedia of International Organized Crime. New York: Facts On File, Inc., 2005.

Further reading
Asbury, Herbert. The Gangs of New York. New York: Alfred A. Knopf, 1928. 
MacIllwain, Jeffrey Scott. Organizing Crime in Chinatown: Race and Racketeering in New York City, 1890-1910. Jefferson, North Carolina: McFarland & Company, 2004. 
O'Kane, James M. The Crooked Ladder: Gangsters, Ethnicity and the American Dream. New Brunswick, New Jersey: Transaction Publishers, 1994. 

1879 births
1941 deaths
American crime bosses
Burials at Cypress Hills Cemetery
Chinese crime bosses
American gangsters of Chinese descent
People from Chinatown, Manhattan
Criminals from Manhattan
Gangsters from New York City
Tongs (organizations)
Chinese emigrants to the United States